Manriki (stylized as MANRIKI in all upper case), also known as Vise, is a 2019 Japanese satirical black comedy film directed by . Takumi Saitoh, who starred in the film, designed and produced the film with comedian . 

Saitoh and director Shimizu based the film on a script that had been inspired by the discomfort Nagano felt at a fashion-industry event. It is the first feature film by Team MANRIKI, a filmmaking project team consisting of Saito, Nagano, Shimizu, and musician and actor Nobuaki Kaneko.

The film won the Asian Award at the 23rd Bucheon International Fantastic Film Festival in 2019.

Notes

References

External links
 Official website (in Japanese)
 

2010s Japanese films
2019 comedy films
Japanese crime comedy films